Lee Myung-jae (Hanja: 李明載; born 4 November 1993) is a South Korean football defender who plays for Gimcheon Sangmu and the South Korea national under-20 football team. Besides South Korea, he has played in Japan.

Club career 
Lee joined Ulsan Hyundai in 2014 and made his league debut against Incheon United on 23 March 2014.

He moved to Albirex Niigata on loan on 24 June 2014.

International career 
He was a member of the South Korea national U-20 team for the 2014 Toulon Tournament.

Club statistics

Honours

Club
Ulsan Hyundai
 K League 1: 2022

References

 
 

 

1993 births
Living people
Association football defenders
South Korean footballers
South Korean expatriate footballers
Albirex Niigata players
Ulsan Hyundai FC players
J1 League players
K League 1 players
Expatriate footballers in Japan
South Korean expatriate sportspeople in Japan